Daniel A. Villa (born September 21, 1964) is a former American football guard who played twelve professional seasons in the National Football League (NFL) for the New England Patriots, Phoenix Cardinals, Kansas City Chiefs, and Carolina Panthers. Villa played college football at Arizona State University.

Villa was born in Nogales, Arizona and is of Mexican descent.

College career
Villa was a first-team All American and PAC-10 selection in 1986. With assistance from Villa, Arizona State averaged more than 200 yards rushing per game for 17 consecutive contests in 1985 and 1986. He was named honorable mention All-PAC 10 in 1985. After not starting a game in 1984 and being moved from quick tackle to strong guard in spring practice then moved back again. He performed in the 1987 East-West Shrine Game and Senior Bowl.

Post-playing career
Villa was the athletic director at Walpole High School in Walpole, Massachusetts. He also served as the head coach of the Walpole Rebels, the Walpole high school football team.

Legal troubles
On December 27, 2008, Villa was arrested in Tucson, Arizona for charges of child rape that allegedly occurred while he was coaching in Massachusetts. On August 26, 2009, he pleaded guilty in court to three counts of rape of a child and two counts of enticing a child. He was sentenced to two years on the first and second rape indictments with 2 years concurrent on the enticing indictments. According to a press release from Norfolk County District Attorney William Keating, he was sentenced to "7 years' probation on the third rape indictment with conditions of probation that he must register as a sex offender, submit to GPS monitoring while on probation, have no contact with the victim or the victim's family and he cannot work with any children under the age of 16. Judge Chernoff also ordered an 'exclusion zone' around every school in the Commonwealth, meaning that Villa cannot set foot in any school in Massachusetts while on probation."

References

1964 births
Living people
All-American college football players
American football offensive guards
Arizona State Sun Devils football players
Carolina Panthers players
High school football coaches in Massachusetts
Kansas City Chiefs players
New England Patriots players
Phoenix Cardinals players
People from Nogales, Arizona
Players of American football from Arizona
American sportspeople of Mexican descent